One Fell Swoop is an album by saxophonist Steve Lacy's Quartet featuring Charles Tyler which was recorded in Paris in 1986 and released on the Swedish Silkheart label.

Reception 

The Penguin Guide to Jazz states "There are signs on One Fell Swoop that he is looking back and rerunning some ideas from his own bottom drawer, reviving that Dixieland counterpoint which had tended to get unravelled and spun out at unrecognisable length in more recent years. The title track (two performances) and "Ode to Lady Day" are splendid performances" In his review on AllMusic, Scott Yanow states "The inside/outside music rewards repeated listenings, and the Lacy/Tyler match-up, helped by their contrasting but complementary styles, works quite well".

Track listing 
All compositions by Steve Lacy except where noted.
 "One Fell Swoop" [Take 2] – 7:52	
 "Ode to Lady Day" (Charles Tyler) – 7:34	
 "Wickets" – 9:46	
 "Keepsake" – 8:44	
 "The Adventures Of" (Tyler) – 7:17	
 "Friday the 13th" (Thelonious Monk) – 4:53	
 "One Fell Swoop" [Take 1] – 7:07 Bonus track on CD

Personnel 
Steve Lacy – soprano saxophone; lays out on "Ode to Lady Day"
Charles Tyler – baritone saxophone, alto saxophone
Jean-Jacques Avenel – bass
Oliver Johnson – drums

References 

Steve Lacy (saxophonist) albums
1987 albums
Silkheart Records albums